Oxytate taprobane is a species of spider of the genus Oxytate. It is endemic to Sri Lanka.

References

taprobane
Endemic fauna of Sri Lanka
Spiders of Asia
Spiders described in 2001